Early elections to the Legislative Council were held in the Colony of Natal between 14 and 20 September 1893. They followed the proclamation of new constitution on 4 July, granting the colony responsible government. Following the election, John Robinson was appointed the colony's first Premier. The new parliament in Pietermaritzburg was opened on 19 October.

References

1893 elections in Africa
Elections in Natal
1893 in the Colony of Natal
September 1893 events